Judkins Park station will be an at-grade Sound Transit East Link light rail station at the south end of the Central District neighborhood of Seattle. It is expected to open along with the section of the line to Overlake in 2024.

Location 
The station will be located in the middle of I-90 in the former express lanes just west of 23rd Ave South. It will have entrances at 23rd Ave South and Rainier Ave South. It will have a center platform and include landscaping around it.

References 

Future Link light rail stations
Link light rail stations in Seattle
Railway stations scheduled to open in 2024
Railway stations in highway medians